Lille Storberg is a Norwegian handball player. She played 55 matches for the Norway women's national handball team between 1965 and 1971.  She participated at the 1971 World Women's Handball Championship, where the Norwegian team placed 7th.

References

Year of birth missing (living people)
Possibly living people
Norwegian female handball players